Suburbanization, or suburbanisation, is a population shift from central urban areas into suburbs, resulting in the formation of (sub)urban sprawl. As a consequence of the movement of households and businesses out of the city centers, low-density, peripheral urban areas grow.  Sub-urbanization is inversely related to urbanization (urbanisation), which denotes a population shift from rural areas into urban centers.

Many residents of metropolitan regions work within the central urban area, but live outside of it, in satellite communities called suburbs, and commute to work by car or mass transit. Others have the opportunity to work from home, due to technological advances. Suburbanization often occurs in more economically developed countries. The United States is believed to be the first country in which the majority of the population lived in suburbs rather than cities or rural areas. Proponents of containing the urban sprawl argue that the sprawl leads to urban decay and a concentration of lower-income residents in the inner city, in addition to environmental harm.

In some cases, suburbanization is temporary. As population grows, the zones of the concentric zone model may move outward to escape the increasing density of inward areas. For example, Kings County, New York served New York City as farmland in the 18th century, with boats carrying produce across the East River. The steam ferry later made Brooklyn Heights a commuter town for Wall Street. With streetcars, suburbanization spread through the county, and the City of Brooklyn grew to fill the county. Areas along the river became industrialized and apartment buildings filled the places where factories did not replace the scattered houses. As a result, much of Brooklyn transformed from a suburban economy into an urban economy entirely—many other suburbs followed this same cycle.

History

United States

Post–World War II economic expansion in the United States brought an increase in suburbanization, when soldiers returned home from war to reside in houses outside of the city. During this time America had a prosperous postwar economy, which resulted in more available leisure time and an increased priority in creating a family unit. Throughout the years, the desire to separate work life and home life has grown, causing an increase in suburban populations. Suburbs are often built around certain industries such as restaurants, shopping, and entertainment, which allows suburban residents to travel less and interact more within the suburban area. Suburbs in the United States have also evolved through advances in technology, which allows for more opportunities in remote work rather than commuting.

In the early 21st century, the spread of communication services, such as broadband, e-mail, and practical home video conferencing, have enabled more people to work from home rather than commuting. This can occur either in the city or in the suburbs, thus giving the suburbs the same advantages, information. and supplies as centralized businesses had. Similarly, the rise of modern delivery logistics in postal services, which take advantage of computerization and the availability of efficient transportation networks, also eliminates some of the advantages that were once to be had from having a business located in the city. Industrial, warehousing, and factory land uses have also moved to suburban areas. This removes the need for company headquarters to be within a quick courier distance of the warehouses and ports. Urban areas often suffer from traffic congestion, which creates extra driver costs for the company that may have otherwise been reduced if they were located in a suburban area near a highway instead. As with residential, lower property taxes and low land prices encourage selling industrial land for profitable brownfield redevelopment.

Suburban areas also offer more land to use as a buffer between industrial areas and residential and retail spaces. This may avoid NIMBY sentiments and gentrification pressure from the local community due to residential and retail areas being adjacent to industrial spaces in an urban area. Suburban municipalities can offer tax breaks, specialized zoning, and regulatory incentives to attract industrial land users to their area, such as City of Industry, California. The overall effect of these developments is that both businesses and individuals now see an advantage to locating in the suburbs, where the cost of buying land, renting space, and running their operations is cheaper than in the city. This continuing dispersal from a single-city center has led to another recent phenomena in American suburbs, the advent of edge cities and exurbs, which arise out of clusters of office buildings built in suburban commercial centers, shopping malls, and other high-density developments. With more and more jobs for suburbanites being located in these areas rather than in the main city core that the suburbs grew out of, traffic patterns, which for decades centered on people commuting into the center city to work in the morning and then returning home in the evening, have become more complex, with the volume of intra-suburban traffic increasing tremendously. By 2000, half of the US population lived in suburban areas.

Eastern Europe

In many countries of Europe, sometimes cities became seen as dangerous or very expensive areas to live, while the suburbs were seen as safe places to live and raise a family. There are periods of opposite developments like urbanization.

During the mid to late 20th century, most socialist countries in the Eastern Bloc were characterized by under-urbanization, which meant that industrial growth occurred well in advance of urban growth, and was sustained by rural-urban commuting. City growth, residential mobility, land, and housing development were under tight political control. Consequently, sub-urbanization in post-socialist Europe is not only a recent, but also a particular, phenomenon. The creation of housing and land markets, together with state's withdrawal from housing provisions have led to the development of privatized modes of housing production and consumption, with an increasing role for private actors and, particularly for households. Yet, the regulatory and institutional frameworks indispensable to a market-driven housing system – including housing finance – have remained underdeveloped, particularly in south-eastern Europe. This environment has undoubtedly stimulated housing self-provision. Clearly, different forces have shaped different outcomes. 

Long-suppressed urbanization and a dramatic housing backlog resulted in extensive peri-urban growth in Tirana (Albania), which during the 1990s doubled the size of the city whereas war refugees put pressure on cities of former Yugoslavia. Elsewhere processes of suburbanization seemed dominant, but their pace differed according to housing shortages, available finances, preferences, and the degree of 'permitted' informality. The process was slow in Prague during the 1990s and more apparent after 2000, when housing affordability improved. Conversely, Slovenian and Romanian suburban developments visibly surrounded cities/towns during the 1990s. Nonetheless, socialist legacies of underdeveloped infrastructure and the affordability crisis of transition differentiate post-socialist suburbs from their Western counterparts.

Various degrees of informality characterized suburban housing from illegal occupation of public land (Tirana), illegal construction on agricultural private land (Belgrade) to the unauthorized but later legalized developments in Romania. Suburban housing displayed a chaotic/unplanned character, especially in south-eastern Europe, where the state retains a degree of illegitimacy. Accepting scattered for-profit housing, much of the new detached suburban houses seem self-developed. Allegedly, owner-building has become a household strategy to adapt to recession, high and volatile inflation, to cut construction costs, and to bridge access to housing. The predominantly owner-built feature of most suburban housing, with the land often obtained at no cost through restitution policies or illegal occupation, allowed a mix of low-/middle-income households within these developments.

Psychological effects

Social isolation

Historically, it was believed that living in highly urban areas resulted in social isolation, disorganization, and psychological problems, while living in the suburbs was supposed to overall improve happiness, due to lower population density, lower crime, and a more stable population.  A study based on data from 1974, however, found this not to be the case, finding that people living in the suburbs had neither greater satisfaction with their neighborhood nor greater satisfaction with the quality of their lives as compared to people living in urban areas.

Drug abuse 
Pre-existing disparities in the demographic composition of suburbs pose problems in drug consumption and abuse. This is due to the disconnection created between drug addiction and the biased outward perception of suburban health and safety. The difference in drug mortality rates of suburban and urban spaces is sometimes fueled by the relationship between the general public, medical practitioners, and the pharmaceutical industry. These affluent individuals who are living in the suburbs often have an increased means of obtaining otherwise expensive and potent drugs, such as opioids and narcotics through valid prescriptions. In the United States, the combination of demographic and economic features created as a result of suburbanization has increased the risk of drug abuse in suburban communities. Heroin in suburban communities has increased in incidence as new heroin users in the United States are predominantly white suburban men and women in their early twenties. Adolescents and young adults are at an increased risk of drug abuse in suburban spaces due to the enclosed social and economic enclaves that surburbanization propagates. The New England Study of Suburban Youth found that the upper middle class suburban cohorts displayed an increased drug use when compared to the natural average.

The shift in demographics and economic statuses caused by suburbanization has increased the risk of drug abuse in affluent American communities and changed the approach to drug abuse public health initiatives. When addressing public health concerns of drug abuse with patients directly, suburban health care providers and medical practitioners have the advantage of treating a demographic of drug abuse patients that are better educated and equipped with resources to recover from addiction and overdose. The disparity of treatment and initiatives between suburban and urban environments in regard to drug abuse and overdose is a public health concern. Although suburban healthcare providers may have more resources to address drug addiction, abuse, and overdose, preconceived ideas about suburban lifestyles may prevent them from providing proper treatment to patients. Considering the increasing incidence of drug abuse in suburban environments, the contextual factors that affect certain demographics must also be considered to better understand the prevalence of drug abuse in suburbs; for example, adolescents and their relationship with social groups in school and other socializing forces that occur as a result of suburbanization impact drug abuse incidence.

Economic impacts
The economic impacts of suburbanization have become very evident since the trend began in the 1950s. Changes in infrastructure, industry, real estate development costs, fiscal policies, and diversity of cities have been easily apparent, as "making it to the suburbs," mainly in order to own a home and escape the chaos of urban centers, have become the goals of many American citizens. These impacts have many benefits as well as side effects and are becoming increasingly important in the planning and revitalization of modern cities.

Impact on urban industry 

The days of industry dominating the urban cores of cities are diminishing as population decentralization of urban centers increases. Companies increasingly look to build industrial parks in less populated areas, largely for more modern buildings and ample parking, as well as to appease the popular desire to work in less congested areas. Government economic policies that provide incentives for companies to build new structures and lack of incentives to build on Brownfield land also contribute to the flight of industrial development from major cities to surrounding suburban areas. As suburban industrial development becomes increasingly more profitable, it becomes less financially attractive to build in high-density areas. Another impact of industry leaving the city is the reduction of buffer zones separating metropolitan areas, industrial parks and surrounding suburban residential areas. As this land becomes more economically relevant, the value of such properties very often increases, causing many undeveloped landowners to sell their land.

Consequences on infrastructure 

As America continues to sprawl, the cost of the required water lines, sewer lines, and roads could cost more than $21,000 per residential and non-residential development unit, costing the American government $1.12 trillion between 2005 and 2030. Along with the costs of infrastructure, existing infrastructure suffers, as most of the government's money that is dedicated to improving infrastructure goes to paying for the new necessities in areas further out from the urban core. As a result, the government will often forgo maintenance on previously built infrastructure.

Real estate development costs 
For residential properties, suburbanization allows lower prices, so people can drive until they can find an area in which they can afford to buy a home. These areas may lack urban infrastructure such as parks and public transit.  Prices of homes downtown usually decrease as well to compete with the inexpensive homes in the suburbs.

One of the main benefits of living in the suburbs is that one gets a much larger piece of land than in the city.  Thus, bigger lots mean fewer lots and suburbanization leads to less intense development of real estate.

Fiscal impact 
The fiscal deficit grows as a result of suburbanization, mainly because in less densely populated areas, property taxes tend to be lower. Also, because of the typical spread pattern of suburban housing, the lack of variety of housing types, and the greater distance between homes, real estate development and public service costs increase, which in turn increase the deficit of upper levels of government.
Conversely, for the cities it meant lower tax incomes, which meant less money for amenities, including libraries and schools, because the people who stayed were lower-income, and because of relative de-population.

Effect on urban diversity 
As the trend of suburbanization took hold, many of the people who left the city for the suburbs were white. As a result, there was a rise in black home ownership in central cities. As white households left for the suburbs, housing prices in transition neighborhoods fell, which often lowered the cost of home ownership for black households. This trend was stronger in older and denser cities, especially in the Northeast and Midwest, because new construction was generally more difficult. As of the 2010 census, minorities like African Americans, Asian Americans and Indo-Americans have become an increasing large factor in recent suburbanization. Many suburbs now have since 1990 large minority communities in suburban and commuter cities.

Environmental impacts 

The growth of suburbanization and the spread of people living outside the city can cause negative impacts on the environment. Suburbanization has been linked to the increase in vehicle mileage, increase land use, and increase in residential energy consumption. From these factors of suburbanization, it has then caused a degradation of air quality, increase usage of natural resources like water and oil, as well as increased amounts of greenhouse gas. With the increased use of vehicles to commute to and from the work place this causes increased use of oil and gas as well as an increase in emissions. With the increase in emissions from vehicles, this then can cause air pollution and degrades the air quality of an area. Suburbanization is growing which causes an increase in housing development, which causes an increase in land consumption and available land. Suburbanization has also been linked to increases in natural resource use like water to meet residents' demands and to maintain suburban lawns. Also, with the increase in technology and consumptions of residents there is an increase in energy consumption by the amount of electricity used by residents.

Social impacts 

Suburbanization has negative social impacts on many groups of people, including children, adolescents, and the elderly.  Children who are affected by suburbanization, or urban sprawl, are commonly referred to as "cul-de-sac kids."  Because children living in a suburb cannot go anywhere without a parent, they are unable to practice being independent.  Teenagers that are unable to be independent experience a lot of boredom, isolation, and frustration.  These feelings have even led to an increase in rates of teenage suicide and school shootings in suburban areas.  Despite these issues with young people, suburbia was still intended for young families.  The elderly in suburbia experience social isolation once they lose their license to drive.  In order to leave their home the elderly need to be able to afford a chauffeur or be willing to ask relatives to drive them around.  This has resulted in upper-class elderly moving to retirement communities.  Both the wealthy elderly and those who still live in suburbs are largely separated from all other groups of society.

See also
Urbanization
Counterurbanization
Transport divide

References
Notes

Bibliography
Burchell, Downs, McCann, Mukherji. (2005) "Sprawl Costs: Economic Impacts of Unchecked Development" London, Island Press.
Boustan, Margo. "WHITE SUBURBANIZATION AND AFRICAN-AMERICAN HOME OWNERSHIP,1940-1980". National Bureau of Economic Research January 2011 18
Fishman, Robert. (1987) Bourgeois Utopias: The Rise and Fall of Suburbia New York: Basic Books.
Garreau, Joel. (1992) Edge City: Life on the New Frontier New York: Anchor Books.
Hayden, Delores. (2004) Building Suburbia: Green Fields and Urban Growth, 1820-2000  New York, Vintage.

Wiese, Andrew. (2006) "African American Suburban Development in Atlanta" Southern Spaces. http://southernspaces.org/2006/african-american-suburban-development-atlanta
Wiese, Andrew. (2005) Places of Their Own: African American Suburbanization in the Twentieth Century Chicago, University of Chicago Press.
Soule, David. (2006) "Urban Sprawl: A Comprehensive Reference Guide" London, Greenwood Press.

Urban planning
Urban decay
Urbanization